Crosbie Ward (10 February 1832 – 10 November 1867) was a 19th-century member of parliament in New Zealand.

Early life
Ward was born in Killinchy in County Down, Ireland, in 1832. His father was Rev. Henry Ward. His paternal grandfather was Edward Ward (1753–1812), who was a member of the Irish House of Commons for 14 years. His grandfather's father-in-law was William Crosbie, 1st Earl of Glandore (1716–1781); from this part of the family came Crosbie Ward's given name. Ward received his education at Castletown, Isle of Man and at Trinity College Dublin.

Two elder (Edward and Henry) and one younger brother (Hamilton) were encouraged by their father to join the emigration to Canterbury in New Zealand. They travelled to Lyttelton on the Charlotte Jane, one of the First Four Ships to arrive in December 1850. They chose Quail Island in Lyttelton Harbour as their farm settlement, but the two elder brothers drowned in June 1851. Hamilton Ward, who had just turned 16, was taken in by Charlotte Godley, the wife of the founder of Canterbury, John Robert Godley. She wrote to the Ward family in Ireland, requesting that somebody come out to take care of Hamilton. Crosbie Ward was sent out; he arrived on the Stag on 17 May 1852. They found Quail Island uneconomic to farm and bought land north of Rangiora instead. The two brothers bought part of the Racecourse Hill run near Darfield; this was managed by Hamilton Ward.

Political career

He was a cabinet minister, Postmaster-General and Secretary for Crown Lands. He was a prominent Christchurch journalist, editing the Lyttelton Times.

On 13 January 1857, he married Margaret (Maggie) Townsend of Rangiora. Their only child was Harriett Louise Frances Ward. He died on 10 November 1867 in London. On 18 September 1868, his widow married John George Cooke at Holy Trinity Church in New Plymouth.

References

|-

|-

|-

1832 births
1867 deaths
Members of the New Zealand House of Representatives
Members of the Cabinet of New Zealand
People from County Down
New Zealand MPs for Christchurch electorates
19th-century New Zealand journalists
Irish emigrants to New Zealand (before 1923)
Male journalists
19th-century male writers
19th-century New Zealand politicians
Alumni of Trinity College Dublin